Kasimovka is a rural locality (a settlement) in Verkhnestaritskoye Rural Settlement, Gaynsky District, Perm Krai, Russia. The population was 428 as of 2010. There are 11 streets.

Geography 
Kasimovka is located 24 km southeast of Gayny (the district's administrative centre) by road. Verkhnyaya Staritsa is the nearest rural locality.

References 

Rural localities in Gaynsky District